Antu railway station (station code ANTU) is a small railway station located in Pratapgarh, in the Indian state of Uttar Pradesh. The closest major railway station is Sahajipur Halt and closest airport is Bamrauli Airport. It belongs to Northern Railway, Pratapgarh, Uttar Pradesh.

Major trains
 Kanpur–Pratapgarh InterCity Express 
 Varanasi–Lucknow Passenger 
 Lucknow–Pratapgarh Passenger 
 Prayag–Lucknow Passenger 
 Bareilly–Prayag Express 
 Ramnagar–Varanasi Passenger 
 Kashi V Express

See also

 Northern Railway zone
 Jhansi Junction railway station

References 

Railway stations in Sultanpur district